Yuni is an internationally co-produced drama film, written and directed by Kamila Andini. It stars Arawinda Kirana in the titular role.

The film had its world premiere at the 2021 Toronto International Film Festival in September 2021, where it was named the winner of the Platform Prize competition. It was selected as the Indonesian entry for the Best International Feature Film at the 94th Academy Awards.

Plot
Yuni, a bright high school student, wants to attend university. She gains notoriety as she rejects a proposal by a man she barely knows. She rejects a second proposal, triggering concern relating to the local belief that if two proposals are rejected, a person will never marry. She finds her love for poetry as an escape from the reality. Until one day, her literature teacher comes to her house and become the third man to propose to her.

Cast
Arawinda Kirana as Yuni
Kevin Ardilova as Yoga
Dimas Aditya as Pak Damar
Neneng Risma as Sarah
Vania Aurell as Nisa
Anne Yasmine as Tika
Marissa Anita as Bu Lies
Asmara Abigail as Suci
Sekar Sari
Rukman Rosadi as Bapak

Production
Director Kamila Andini, along with producer Ifa Isfansyah and co-writer Prima Rusdi, had started working on Yuni in 2017. The project had been selected by TorinoFilmLab for the 2018 Torino FeatureLab.

Release
Yuni had its world premiere at the 2021 Toronto International Film Festival in September 2021. By the end of its run, the film will have screened at film festivals in Busan, Vancouver, Rome, Brisbane, Philadelphia and Tokyo. It is set to screen at the theatres in Indonesia on 9 December 2021.

Accolades

See also
 List of submissions to the 94th Academy Awards for Best International Feature Film
 List of Indonesian submissions for the Academy Award for Best International Feature Film

References

External links
 

2021 films
2021 drama films
Javanese-language films
Indonesian-language films
Films directed by Kamila Andini
Indonesian drama films
2020s coming-of-age drama films
Indonesian coming-of-age drama films